Fuyuan National Forest Recreation Area,  also reputed as the “Butterfly Valley”, is located in Fuyuan Village, Ruisui Township, Hualien County, Taiwan.

Geology
The Fuyuan River passes through the park and Fuyuan Waterfalls is located in the park. The recreation area is equipped with BBQ area, camping ground, jungle trekking trails, etc.

See also
 Geography of Taiwan

References

Geography of Hualien County
National forest recreation areas in Taiwan
Tourist attractions in Hualien County